Rosbaud is an Austrian surname. Notable people with the surname include:

Hans Rosbaud (1895–1962), 20th Century Austrian conductor
Paul Rosbaud, 20th Century Austrian scientist and spy for Great Britain during World War II

See also
Roubaud

Germanic-language surnames